Anumasamudrampeta is a village in Nellore district of the state of Andhra Pradesh in India.

References 

Villages in Nellore district